The following list outlines the structure of the federal government of Canada, the collective set of federal institutions which can be grouped into the legislative, executive, and judicial branches.  In turn, these are further divided into departments, agencies, and other organizations which support the day-to-day function of the Canadian state.

The list includes roughly 130 departments and other organizations, with nearly 300,000 employees, who collectively form the Public Service of Canada. Special Operating Agencies (which are departmental organizations), and non-departmental organizations such as Crown corporations, administrative tribunals, and oversight organizations are parts of the public service operating in areas seen as requiring a higher level of independence from it and the direct political control of ministers. Public servants are agents of the Crown and responsible to Parliament through their relevant minister.

This list is organized according to functional grouping and is further subdivided by category such as offices, departments, agencies, and Crown corporations:

The Crown

Regal and vice-regal offices
 King of Canada
 Canadian Secretary to the King
 Governor General of Canada
Secretary to the Governor General of Canada
Canadian Heraldic Authority

King's Privy Council
King's Privy Council for Canada
 Cabinet of Canada
 Treasury Board of Canada
 Canada School of Public Service
 Treasury Board Secretariat
 Privy Council Office
 Intergovernmental Affairs Secretariat
 Office of the Leader of the Government in the House of Commons

Executive

Public Service

Central agencies

Ministerial departments

Separate agency with direct ministerial oversight

Independent agencies and offices 
 Canadian Judicial Council
 National Judicial Institute
 National Security and Intelligence Review Agency
 Office of the Commissioner for Federal Judicial Affairs
 Office of the Chief Military Judge 
Public Service Commission of Canada
 Transportation Safety Board

Independent review bodies 
 Federal Public Sector Labour Relations and Employment Board
 Public Servants Disclosure Protection Tribunal
 Canadian Human Rights Commission
 Canadian Human Rights Tribunal

Canadian Armed Forces

Parliament

Senate of Canada

Procedural officers 
 Speaker of the Senate
 Clerk of the Senate and Clerk of the Parliaments
 Usher of the Black Rod of the Senate of Canada

Standing committees 
 Aboriginal Peoples
 Agriculture and Forestry
 Banking, Trade, and Commerce
 Ethics and Conflict of Interest for Senators
 Energy, the Environment and Natural Resources
 Fisheries and Oceans
 Foreign Affairs and International Trade
 Human Rights
 Internal Economy, Budgets, and Administration
 Diversity subcommittee
 Human Resources subcommittee
 Senate Estimates subcommittee
 Legal and Constitutional Affairs
 National Finance
 National Security and Defence
 Official Languages
 Rules, Procedure and the Rights of Parliament
 Selection Committee
 Social Affairs, Science and Technology
 Transport and Communication

House of Commons of Canada

Procedural officers 
 Speaker of the House of Commons
 Clerk of the House of Commons
 Deputy Clerk of the House of Commons
 Clerk Assistant
 Law Clerk and Parliamentary Counsel
 Sergeant-at-Arms

Standing committees 
Access to Information, Privacy and Ethics
Agriculture and Agri-Food
Canadian Heritage
Citizenship and Immigration
Environment and Sustainable Development
Finance
Fisheries and Oceans
Foreign Affairs and International Development
Government Operations and Estimates
Health
Human Resources, Skills and Social Development andthe Status of Persons with Disabilities
Indigenous and Northern Affairs
Industry, Science and Technology
International Trade
Justice and Human Rights
National Defence
Natural Resources
Official Languages
Procedure and House Affairs
Public Accounts
Public Safety and National Security
Status of Women
Transport, Infrastructure and Communities
Veterans Affairs

Joint Standing Committees
Library of Parliament
Scrutiny of Regulations

Officers of Parliament
Auditor General of Canada
Commissioner of Lobbying of Canada
 Conflict of Interest and Ethics Commissioner of Canada
 Information Commissioner of Canada
Intelligence Commissioner of Canada
 Elections Canada
 Privacy Commissioner of Canada
 Public Sector Integrity Commissioner of Canada 
 Parliamentary Budget Officer

Agencies 

 Parliamentary Protective Service

Review bodies
 National Security and Intelligence Committee of Parliamentarians

Courts 

 Supreme Court of Canada
 Federal Court of Appeal
 Court Martial Appeal Court of Canada
 Federal Court of Canada
 Tax Court of Canada

See also

 Civil Service Act, 1918
 Special Operating Agency
 State-owned enterprise
Canadian Crown Corporation
 Canadian Coast Guard Auxiliary
 Royal Canadian Marine Search and Rescue
 PPP Canada

Provincial and territorial equivalents
 Executive Council of Alberta
 Executive Council of British Columbia
 Executive Council of Manitoba
 Executive Council of Newfoundland and Labrador
 Executive Council of New Brunswick
 Executive Council of Nova Scotia
 Executive Council of Ontario
 Executive Council of Prince Edward Island
 Executive Council of Quebec
 Executive Council of Saskatchewan
 Executive Council of the Northwest Territories
 Executive Council of Nunavut
 Executive Council of Yukon
 Government of Alberta
 Government of British Columbia
 Government of Manitoba
 Government of Newfoundland and Labrador
 Government of New Brunswick
 Government of Nova Scotia
 Government of Ontario
 Government of Prince Edward Island
 Government of Quebec
 Government of Saskatchewan

References

External links 
 List of Government of Canada departments and agencies

 
Canada
Gov